The Eparchy of Valjevo is one of the eparchies of the Serbian Orthodox Church, with the seat at Valjevo, Serbia.

After the passing of Bishop Milutin (Knežević) on 30 March 2020, the eparchy has been led on an administrative basis by Bishop Lavrentije (Trifunović).

Church-buildings

References

External links 
 Official site

Serbian Orthodox Church in Serbia
Religious sees of the Serbian Orthodox Church
Kolubara District
Christian organizations established in the 18th century
18th century in Serbia
Dioceses established in the 18th century